The Ven. Richard Daniel (9 July 1681 – 30 April 1739) was a Church of Ireland priest in the first half of the 18th-century.

Gore was born in Dublin and educated at Trinity College there. He was Archdeacon of Killaloe from 1714 to 1731; Dean of Armagh from 1722 until 1731. and Dean of Down from 1731 until his death.

Notes

Archdeacons of Killaloe
Deans of Armagh
Deans of Down
18th-century Irish Anglican priests
1739 deaths
1681 births
Alumni of Trinity College Dublin
Christian clergy from Dublin (city)